Shigeo Kogure (木暮 茂夫, October 3, 1935 – October 13, 2009) was a Japanese bantamweight weightlifter who won a gold medal at the 1958 Asian Games and placed fourth at the 1960 Summer Olympics, both held in Tokyo.

References

1935 births
2009 deaths
Olympic weightlifters of Japan
Weightlifters at the 1960 Summer Olympics
Asian Games medalists in weightlifting
Weightlifters at the 1958 Asian Games
Asian Games gold medalists for Japan
Medalists at the 1958 Asian Games
20th-century Japanese people